"All Night Long (All Night)" is a hit single by American singer and songwriter Lionel Richie from 1983. Taken from his second solo album, Can't Slow Down (1983), it combined Richie's soulful Commodores style with Caribbean influences. This single reached number one on three Billboard charts (pop, R&B and adult contemporary). In the UK, it peaked at number two on the singles chart.

The song lyrics were written primarily in English, but Richie has admitted in at least one press interview that "African" lyrics in the song, such as "Tom bo li de say de moi ya" and "Jambo jumbo", were in fact his sui generis dialects. Richie has described these portions of the song as a "wonderful joke", written when he discovered that he lacked the time to hire a translator to contribute the foreign-language lyrics he wished to include in the song.

Cash Box summed up its review of the single saying "Richie’s command of these diverse musical elements and shifts in melodic direction is as impressive as it is pleasureable."

Music video
An accompanying music video for "All Night Long (All Night)" was produced by former Monkee and TV video pioneer Michael Nesmith and directed by Bob Rafelson.

Notable uses
Richie performed the song at the closing ceremonies of the 1984 Summer Olympics in Los Angeles.

The song was used in the pilot episode for Miami Vice, "Brother's Keeper". While Richie was supposed to appear in the episode to sing it, he was on tour at the time and couldn't make it to the filming location; an unnamed band plays the song in the episode.

The song was used in the fourth episode of the fourth season of Brooklyn Nine-Nine.

Charts

Original 1983 version

Weekly charts

Year-end charts

All-time charts

Certifications

Personnel 
Personnel as listed in the album's liner notes are:
 Lionel Richie – lead and backing vocals, Yamaha GS-1 synthesizer, rhythm and vocal arrangements
 Greg Phillinganes – Yamaha GS-1 synthesizer
 Darrell Jones – guitar
 Carlos Rios – guitar
 Tim May – guitar
 Abraham Laboriel – bass guitar
 John "J.R." Robinson – drums
 Paulinho da Costa – percussion
 Melinda Chatman – vocal sound effects
 James Anthony Carmichael – backing vocals; horn, rhythm and string arrangements 
 David Cochrane – backing vocals
 Calvin Harris – backing vocals
 Richard Marx – backing vocals
 Deborah Thomas – backing vocals
 Kin Vassy – backing vocals

Chant vocals
 Diane Burt, James Anthony Carmichael, Melinda Chatman, David Cochrane, Dr. Lloyd Byro Greig, Calvin Harris, Brenda Harvey-Richie, Jeanette Hawes, Janice Marie Johnson, Richard Marx, Deborah Joyce Richie, Lionel Richie, Suzanne Stanford and Deborah Thomas

Hoopa hollers
 Marilyn Ammons, Sue Ann Butler, Melinda Chatman, Sheldon J. Cohn, Esq., Sandy Dent-Crimmel, Ruth Diaz, David Egerton, Sylvia Genauer, Rejauna Lynn Green, Gabrielle Greig, Sally Greig, Tanya Greig, Darrell Jones, David Malvin, Alison Maxwell, Jerry Montes, John Michael Montes, Billy "Bass" Nelson, Greg Phillinganes, Carlos Rios, Suzanne Stanford, Randy Stern, Wilbert Terrell and Susan Wood 

Production
 Lionel Richie – producer 
 James Anthony Carmichael – producer
 Calvin Harris – recording engineer
 Steve Crimmel – second recording engineer
 David Egerton – second recording engineer, gibberish vocals
 Mark Ettel – second recording engineer

2011 version (with Guy Sebastian)

Richie recorded a new version of the song with Australian singer Guy Sebastian in 2011. All proceeds went towards the Queensland floods and New Zealand earthquake appeal. The re-recorded version was produced by RedOne and was released to iTunes Stores in Australia and New Zealand on 18 and 16 March, respectively.

Charts
It debuted on the New Zealand Singles Chart at number twelve on 21 March 2011 and on the Australian ARIA Singles Chart at number twenty-six on 28 March 2011.

Jacob Collier version
In 2018, English singer, arranger, composer, producer, and multi-instrumentalist Jacob Collier collaborated with Take 6 and the Metropole Orkest on a version of "All Night Long". Collier's arrangement won the 2020 Grammy Award for Best Arrangement, Instruments and Vocals. The version was included on Collier's studio album, Djesse Vol. 1 (2018). The album peaked at number six on the Billboard Top Classical Albums and Top Jazz Albums.

Benjamin Ingrosso version

In 2019, Swedish singer Benjamin Ingrosso recorded a version at the Spotify studios, Stockholm. It was released in March 2019 and peaked at number 5 on the Swedish charts and was certified platinum in June 2019. The rearranged version of the song, titled as "All Night Long (All Night) [2020 Edit]" was released on 17 July 2020.

Charts

Weekly charts

Year-end charts

Certifications

Sverigetopplistan

Samplings
Parts of the song were used in "I Like It", a 2010 song composed by Enrique Iglesias, Pitbull, and RedOne with samplings from Lionel Richie as the 1983 classic is interpolated after the first and third choruses.

See also
 List of Hot 100 number-one singles of 1983 (U.S.)
 List of number-one R&B singles of 1983 (U.S.)
 List of number-one adult contemporary singles of 1983 (U.S.)

References

External links
 List of cover versions of "All Night Long (All Night)" at SecondHandSongs.com

1983 singles
2011 singles
2019 singles
American reggae songs
Calypso songs
Lionel Richie songs
Guy Sebastian songs
Benjamin Ingrosso songs
Billboard Hot 100 number-one singles
Cashbox number-one singles
Number-one singles in Australia
RPM Top Singles number-one singles
Number-one singles in South Africa
Songs written by Lionel Richie
Macaronic songs
Swahili-language songs
1983 songs
Motown singles
Song recordings produced by James Anthony Carmichael
Songs about dancing